commonly abbreviated as Nintendo EAD and formerly known as Nintendo Research & Development No.4 Department (abbreviated as Nintendo R&D4), was the largest software development division within the Japanese video game company Nintendo. It was preceded by the Creative Department, a team of designers with backgrounds in art responsible for many different tasks, to which Shigeru Miyamoto and Takashi Tezuka originally belonged. Both served as managers of the EARD studios and were credited in every game developed by the division, with varying degrees of involvement. Nintendo EAD was best known for its work on games in the Donkey Kong, Mario, The Legend of Zelda, F-Zero, Star Fox, Animal Crossing, Pikmin and Wii series.

Following a large company restructuring after the death of company president Satoru Iwata, the division merged with Nintendo's Software Planning & Development division in September 2015, becoming Nintendo Entertainment Planning & Development.

History

Background
During the 1970s, when Nintendo was still predominantly a toy company, it decided to expand into interactive entertainment and the video game industry. Several designers were hired to work under the Creative Department, which, at the time, was the only game development department within Nintendo. Among these new designers were Makoto Kano, who went on to design various Game & Watch games, and Shigeru Miyamoto, who would create various Nintendo franchises. In 1972, the department was renamed to Research & Development Department; it had about 20 employees. The department was later consolidated into a division and separated into three groups, Nintendo R&D1, R&D2 and R&D3.

1980–1989: Creation as Research & Development 4

Around 1983/1984, in the wake of Donkey Kong'''s commercial success, a game designed by Shigeru Miyamoto, Hiroshi Imanishi oversaw the creation of Research & Development No. 4 Department (commonly abbreviated to Nintendo R&D4), as a new development department dedicated to developing video game titles for dedicated consoles, complementing the other three existing departments in the Nintendo Manufacturing Division, green-lit by then-Nintendo president Hiroshi Yamauchi. Imanishi appointed Hiroshi Ikeda, a former anime director at Toei Animation, as general manager of the newly created department, and Miyamoto as its chief producer, who would later become one of the most recognized video game developers in the world. Nintendo also drafted a couple of key graphic designers to the department including Takashi Tezuka and Kenji Miki. With the arcade market dwindling, Nintendo R&D1's former focus, the department concentrated most of their software development resources on the emerging handheld video game console market, primarily thanks to the worldwide success of Nintendo's Game Boy. This catapulted the R&D4 department to become the lead software developer for Nintendo home video game consoles, developing a myriad of games for the Family Computer home console (abbreviated to Famicom, known as the Nintendo Entertainment System in North America, Europe, and Australia).

Hiroshi Ikeda's creative team had many video game design ideas but was lacking the necessary programming power to make it all happen. Toshihiko Nakago, and his small company Systems Research & Development (SRD), had its expertise in computer-aided design (CAD) tools and was very familiar with the Famicom chipset, and was originally hired to work with Masayuki Uemura's Nintendo R&D2 to internally develop software development kits. When Nintendo R&D2 and SRD jointly began porting over R&D1 arcade games to the Famicom, Shigeru Miyamoto took the opportunity to lure Nakago away from R&D2, to help Miyamoto create his first Nintendo R&D4 video game, Excitebike. And so the original R&D4 department became composed of Miyamoto, Takashi Tezuka, Kenji Miki, and Minoru Maeda handling design; Koji Kondo, Akito Nakatsuka, and Hirokazu Tanaka handling sound design; and Toshihiko Nakago and SRD became the technology and programming core.

The same Miyamoto-led team that developed Excitebike went on to develop a 1985 NES port of the scrolling beat 'em up arcade game Kung-Fu Master (1984) called Kung Fu. Miyamoto's team used the technical knowledge they had gained from working on both side-scrollers to further advance the platforming "athletic game" genre they had created with Donkey Kong and were key steps towards Miyamoto's vision of an expansive side-scrolling platformer.

One of the first games developed by the R&D4 department was Mario Bros. in 1983, designed and directed by Miyamoto. The department was, however, unable to program the game with such an inexperienced team, and so counted on programming assistance from Gunpei Yokoi and the R&D1 department. One of the first completely self-developed games was Super Mario Bros., the sequel to Mario Bros. The game set standards for the platform genre, and went on to be both a critical and commercial success. In 1986, R&D4 developed The Legend of Zelda, for which Miyamoto again served as a director. The phenomenal sales of Super Mario Bros. and The Legend of Zelda fueled the expansion of the department with young game designers such as Hideki Konno, Katsuya Eguchi, Kensuke Tanabe, Takao Shimizu, who would later become producers themselves.

1989–2002: Renamed to Entertainment Analysis & Development
In 1989, one year before the Super Famicom was released in Japan, the R&D4 department was spun-off and made its own division named Nintendo Entertainment Analysis & Development (commonly abbreviated as Nintendo EAD). The division was comprised into two departments: the Software Development Department, which focused on video game development and was led by Miyamoto, and the Technology Development Department, which focused on programming and developing tools and was led by Takao Sawano. The technology department was born out of several R&D2 engineers that were assisting SRD with software libraries. After that, the same department later collaborated with Argonaut Games to develop the Super FX chip technology for the SNES, first used in Star Fox in 1993. This venture allowed the Technology Development Department to become more prominent in the 3D era, where they programmed several of Nintendo EAD's 3D games with SRD.

F-Zero, released in 1990, was the first video game fully programmed at the division. Prior to that, most programming was outsourced to SRD Co. Ltd.

In 1997, Miyamoto explained that about twenty to thirty employees were devoted to each Nintendo EAD title during the course of its development. It was then that he also disclosed the existence of the SRD programming company within the division, formally Nintendo R&D2's software unit, which was composed of about 200 employees with proficiency in software programming.

In the advent of launching both the GameCube and Game Boy Advance, Nintendo sought to change the structure of its corporate management. In June 2000, in an attempt to include both software and hardware experts in the board of directors, EAD and Integrated Research & Development general managers, Shigeru Miyamoto and Genyo Takeda respectively, entered the body. In addition, former HAL Laboratory president and future Nintendo president, Satoru Iwata, also entered the board. With Miyamoto being promoted to the board of directors, he was now in charge of overseeing all of Nintendo's software development. To fill Miyamoto's void as a producer, there were a series of promotions in the division: starting with long-time Miyamoto colleague Takashi Tezuka, as deputy general manager, as well as promoting several senior directors like Eiji Aonuma, Hideki Konno, Takao Shimizu, Tadashi Sugiyama and Katsuya Eguchi to producers overseeing their own development teams in the division. Nevertheless, after the promotion, Miyamoto still went on to produce some games.

On November 24, 2000, Nintendo moved its Japanese headquarters, along with its internal teams, into a newly built facility. The new building was primarily built to provide a more expansive workplace for Nintendo's growing development teams.

In 2002, Nintendo opened a Nintendo EAD studio in Tokyo, appointing Takao Shimizu as manager of the branch. The studio was created with the goal of bringing in fresh new talent from the capital of Japan who wouldn't be willing or able to travel to Kyoto. Their first project was Donkey Kong Jungle Beat for the GameCube which made use of the DK Bongos, initially created for Donkey Konga.

2003–2015: Restructure, new managers, and merger with SPD
On September 30, 2003, as a result of a corporate restructure Nintendo was undergoing, in which several members of the Nintendo R&D1 and R&D2 were reassigned under Nintendo EAD, the department was consolidated into a division and began welcoming a new class of managers and producers. Hideki Konno, Katsuya Eguchi, Eiji Aonuma, Hiroyuki Kimura, and Tadashi Sugiyama were appointed project managers of their own groups within the Software Development Department; Shimizu was appointed project manager of the Tokyo Software Development Department, and Keizo Ota and Yasunari Nishida were appointed project managers of their own groups in the Technology Development Department.

In 2013, Katsuya Eguchi was promoted Department Manager of both Software Development Departments in Kyoto and Tokyo. As such, he left his role as Group Manager of Software Development Group No. 2, and was replaced by Hisashi Nogami. On June 18, 2014, the EAD Kyoto branch was moved from the Nintendo Central Office to the Nintendo Development Center in Kyoto. The building housed more than 1100 developers from all of Nintendo's internal research and development divisions, which included the Nintendo EAD, SPD, IRD and SDD divisions.

On September 16, 2015, EAD merged with Nintendo Software Planning & Development into a single game development division, Entertainment Planning & Development (EPD). The move followed an internal restructuring of Nintendo executives and departments after the death of former president Satoru Iwata in July 2015.

Structure

The Nintendo Entertainment Analysis & Development division was headed by Nintendo-veteran Takashi Tezuka who acted as general manager. The division was divided in two development departments: one in Kyoto, with Katsuya Eguchi acting as its deputy general manager; and one in Tokyo, with Yoshiaki Koizumi acting as its deputy general manager.

Kyoto Software Development Department

The Nintendo EAD Kyoto Software Development Department was the largest and one of the oldest research and development departments within Nintendo, housing more than 700 video game developers. It was located in Kyoto, Japan, formerly in the Nintendo Central Office, but on June 28, 2014, it was relocated to the new Nintendo Development Center, which housed all of Nintendo's internal research and development divisions.

The development department integrated Nintendo's most notable producers: Hideki Konno, producer of the Nintendogs and Mario Kart series; Katsuya Eguchi, producer of the Wii and Animal Crossing series; Eiji Aonuma, producer of The Legend of Zelda series; Hiroyuki Kimura, producer Big Brain Academy, Super Mario Bros., and Pikmin series; and Tadashi Sugiyama, producer of the Wii Fit, Steel Diver and Star Fox series.

The department was managed by veteran Nintendo game designer Katsuya Eguchi. As such, Hisashi Nogami later succeeded him as the producer of the Animal Crossing franchise and was responsible for the creation of the Splatoon series.

Technology Development Department

Tokyo Software Development Department

The Nintendo EAD Tokyo Software Development Department was created in 2002 with the goal of bringing in fresh new talent from the capital of Japan who wouldn't be willing to travel hundreds of miles away to Kyoto. It is located in Tokyo, Japan, in the Nintendo Tokyo Office.

In 2003, twenty members of the Entertainment Analysis & Development Division in Kyoto volunteered to relocate to Nintendo's Tokyo Office to expand development resources. These twenty volunteers were primarily from the Super Mario Sunshine team. Management saw it as a good opportunity to expand and recruit several developers who were more comfortable living in Tokyo than relocating to Kyoto.

Takao Shimizu (original manager and producer) and Yoshiaki Koizumi (director) began hiring several recruits in Tokyo coming from several established companies like SEGA, Koei, and Square-Enix. Shimizu and Koizumi jointly spearheaded their first project, Donkey Kong Jungle Beat. This was followed in 2007 by the release of the critically and commercially acclaimed Super Mario Galaxy. After the release of Super Mario Galaxy'', Koizumi was promoted to manager and producer and officially opened Tokyo Software Development Group No. 2.

The Tokyo group had veteran game developer Katsuya Eguchi as its general manager, who also oversaw development operations for the Kyoto Software Development Department.

List of software developed
The following is a list of software developed by the Nintendo Entertainment Analysis & Development Division.

Notes

References

Nintendo divisions and subsidiaries
Video game companies established in 1983
Video game companies disestablished in 2015
Defunct video game companies of Japan
Japanese companies disestablished in 2015
Japanese companies established in 1983